Joan Capdevila Esteve (born 12 July 1965) is a Spanish veterinarian and politician from Catalonia who serves as Member of the Congress of Deputies of Spain and current chair of the Congress' Committee on Industry, Trade and Tourism.

Early life
Capdevila was born on 12 July 1965 in Martorell, Catalonia. He has a degree in veterinary medicine from the University of Extremadura and a master's degree from the Autonomous University of Barcelona.

Career
Capdevila is a veterinarian. He was one of the founders and the first director of the El Matí Digital online newspaper.

Capdevila is Christian democrat and was a member of the Democratic Union of Catalonia until 2009 when he left the party after disagreeing with the leadership of Josep Antoni Duran i Lleida.

Capdevila contested the 2015 general election as an independent Republican Left of Catalonia–Catalonia Yes (ERC–CatSí) electoral alliance candidate in the Province of Barcelona and was elected to the Congress of Deputies. He was re-elected at the 2016 and 2019 general elections.

Personal life
Capdevila is married and has a daughter and a son.

Electoral history

References

1965 births
Autonomous University of Barcelona alumni
Independent politicians in Catalonia
Living people
Members of the 11th Congress of Deputies (Spain)
Members of the 12th Congress of Deputies (Spain)
Members of the 13th Congress of Deputies (Spain)
People from Baix Llobregat
Spanish veterinarians
Members of the 14th Congress of Deputies (Spain)